Parné-sur-Roc is a commune in the Mayenne department in northwestern France, boarding the Jouanne river.

See also
Communes of Mayenne

References

Parnesurroc